HBC CSKA Moscow is a women's handball club from Moscow, Russia, that competes in the Russian Super League since season 2019–2020. After the launching of the 2022 Russian invasion of Ukraine, the European Handball Federation in February 2022 temporarily suspended the team.

Achievements

Russia
Russian Super League: 
Winners (1): 2020–21 
Finalist (1): 2021-22
Russian Cup
Winners (1): 2022

Europe
EHF Champions League:
Semifinalist: 2021

Crest, colours, supporters

Kit manufacturers and Shirt sponsor
The following table shows in detail HBC CSKA Moscow kit manufacturers and shirt sponsors by year:

Kits

Arena

Name: Universal Sports Hall CSKA 
City: Moscow, Russia
Capacity: 5,500 spectators

Team

Current squad

Squad for the 2022–23 season

Goalkeepers
     Kira Trusova
 18     Valeria Vasilenko
 99  Polina Kaplina
Left wingers
 3  Polina Gorshkova
 19  Yulia Markova
     Natalia Kotina 
Right wingers
 91  Sara Ristovska
 77  Albina Murzaliyeva
Line players 
 67  Anastasia Illarionava
 10  Viktoryia Shamanouskaya

Left backs
 8  Elena Mikhaylichenko
         Anastasia Kulak
Centre backs
 23  Natalia Chigirinova
 33  Yekaterina Ilyina
 25  Karina Sabirova
Right backs
 39  Antonina Skorobogatchenko

Transfers
Transfers for the 2023–24 season

 Joining

 Leaving
  Kira Trusova (GK) (to  HC Dunărea Brăila)

Technical staff
Staff for the current season 
 Head Coach:  Olga Akopyan
 Goalkeeping Coach:  Lyubov Aleksandrovna Korotneva

Notable former club players
  Victoria Zhilinskayte (2019–2020)
  Yana Zhilinskayte (2019–2020)
  Olga Gorshenina (2019–2021)
  Elena Utkina (2019–2020)
  Marina Sudakova (2020–2022)
  Polina Vedekhina (2019–2022)
  Anna Sedoykina (2020–2022)
  Valeria Maslova (2022)
  Chana Masson (2019–2021)
  Sabina Jacobsen (2019–2021)
  Kathrine Heindahl (2020–2022)
  Ana Gros (2021–2022)
  Dragana Cvijić (2021–2022)

Head coach history 
  Jan Leslie (2019–2021)
  Olga Akopyan (2021) (interim)
  Florentin Pera (2021–2022)
  Olga Akopyan (2022–)

Statistics

Top scorers in the EHF Champions League 
(All-Time) – Last updated on 20 February 2022

European record

References

CSKA Moscow
Russian handball clubs
2019 establishments in Russia
Handball clubs established in 2019